The 1979 World Netball Championships was the fifth edition of the INF Netball World Cup, a quadrennial premier event in international netball. It was held in Port of Spain, Trinidad and Tobago, featuring 19 teams.

Australia, New Zealand and Trinidad and Tobago shared the title as there were no finals, instead the top 10 teams playing off in a round robin. Each of the top three teams won eight out of nine matches, losing once, to one of the other two: New Zealand defeated Trinidad and Tobago 49–33; Trinidad and Tobago defeated Australia 40–38; and Australia defeated New Zealand 38–36. The tournament rules of the time did not provide a way of determining an outright winner under the circumstances, so the three teams shared the title.

First round

Group 1

Group 2

Group 3

Group 4

Group 5

Placement round

Round 1

Round 2

Round 3

Round 4

Round 5

Round 6

Round 7

Round 8

Round 9

Final Round

Round 1

Round 2

Round 3

Round 4

Round 5

Round 6

Round 7

Round 8

Round 9

Final placings

Medallists

References

Netball World Cup
Netball competitions in Trinidad and Tobago
1979 in netball
1979 in Trinidad and Tobago
International sports competitions hosted by Trinidad and Tobago
Sport in Port of Spain
August 1979 sports events in North America